Agents of Oblivion is the only album by American rock band Agents of Oblivion fronted by Dax Riggs, formerly of Acid Bath.

Track listing
 "Endsmouth" – 4:24
 "Slave Riot" – 3:21
 "A Song That Crawls" – 4:10
 "Dead Girl" – 6:25 [Acid Bath cover]
 "Phantom Green" – 5:06
 "The Hangman's Daughter" – 4:34
 "Ladybug" – 4:33
 "Ash of the Mind" – 3:52
 "Wither" – 4:18
 "Paroled in '54" – 5:04
 "Anthem (For This Haunted City)" – 3:40
 "Cosmic Dancer" – 5:34 [T. Rex cover]
 "Big Black Backwards" – 6:42

Personnel 
Dax Riggs – vocals, guitar
Mike Sanchez – guitar
Alex Bergeron – bass
Chuck Pitre – keyboards
Jeff McCarty – drums

The album's artwork, including the cover and disc art, was lifted from Mike Mignola's Hellboy comic book series.

Additional notes
 "Endsmouth" is a tribute to the Oni Press comic Neil Gaiman's Only the End of the World Again, which references the Cthulhu Mythos. 
 The ending from "Phantom Green" is from Tim Burton's film Ed Wood (1994). It is not the actual clip from Bride of the Monster.
 The track "Dead Girl" is an electric guitar arrangement and cover of an acoustic track from Acid Bath's Paegan Terrorism Tactics.
 "Cosmic Dancer" is a T. Rex cover.
"Big Black Backwards" and "Slave Riot" feature clips from the movie Gummo.

References

2000 debut albums
Dax Riggs albums